, also known as Blood Type: Blue or The Blue Stigma, is a 1978 Japanese science fiction film by director Kihachi Okamoto.  It deals with prejudice against UFO witnesses whose blood is turned blue by the encounter.

Cast
 Hiroshi Katsuno : Oki Taisuke
 Keiko Takeshita : Nishida Saeko
 Kunie Tanaka : Nishida Kazuo
 Masaya Oki : Harada
 Eiji Okada : Hyodo
 Kaoru Yachigusa
 Hideyo Amamoto
 Yoshio Inaba
 Shin Kishida
 Naoko Otani
 Etsushi Takahashi as Sawaki
 Sachio Sakai : Taxi driver
 Yoshio Inaba : Commander
 Eitaro Ozawa : Godai
 Ichirō Nakatani : Usami
 Hideji Ōtaki : Takeiri
 Shinsuke Ashida : Aiba
 Tatsuya Nakadai : Minami Kazuya

References

External links

Review

1978 films
1970s science fiction films
1970s Japanese-language films
Films directed by Kihachi Okamoto
Toho tokusatsu films
Films with screenplays by Sô Kuramoto
1970s Japanese films